The Woonsocket City Hall, (also known as the Harris Institute) is located in Woonsocket, Rhode Island.

Edward Harris, a leading Woonsocket industrialist, constructed the earliest part of the building in 1856, and it was known as the Harris Block, with stores on the first floor, and an auditorium hall seating 1,100 on the third floor.  This brick structure has elements of Italianate styling, including round-arch windows and a heavily dentilled cornice.  A major Richardsonian Romanesque addition, called the Granite Block, was made to the north of this structure in 1891.  In 1902 the city purchased the building for use as city hall.

The builders of the original building were Albert B. Cole of Woonsocket and a Mr. Slade of Providence, probably Obadiah Slade, carpenter. The 1891 addition was built by Cutting & Bishop of Worcester. The architect of neither section is known.

The building served as the first public library in Rhode Island, housed on the second floor, which is now the Woonsocket Harris Public Library.

In March 1860 Abraham Lincoln spoke to a packed crowd in Harris Hall, which at the time contained one of the largest assembly rooms in the state.

See also
National Register of Historic Places listings in Providence County, Rhode Island

References and external links
Erik Eckilson, "Woonsocket, My Town"

City and town halls on the National Register of Historic Places in Rhode Island
Government buildings completed in 1856
Buildings and structures in Woonsocket, Rhode Island
City halls in Rhode Island
National Register of Historic Places in Providence County, Rhode Island
1856 establishments in Rhode Island